Merlin Henry Kopp (January 2, 1892 - May 6, 1960) was a Major League Baseball outfielder.

Kopp also had an extensive minor league baseball career. In all, he played eighteen seasons professionally, from  until . He spent most of his career with the St. Thomas Saints of the Canadian League (1911–15) and the Sacramento Senators of the Pacific Coast League (1920–28).

Sources

Major League Baseball outfielders
Washington Senators (1901–1960) players
Philadelphia Athletics players
St. Thomas Saints players
Buffalo Bisons (minor league) players
Atlanta Crackers players
Seattle Rainiers players
Sacramento Senators players
Baseball players from Ohio
1892 births
1960 deaths
Sportspeople from Toledo, Ohio